Bangiku may refer to:

 Bangiku (short story), a 1948 short story by Japanese writer Fumiko Hayashi
 Late Chrysanthemums (1954 film), a Japanese film based on Hayashi's story
 Bangiku (1960 TV film), a Japanese TV film based on Hayashi's story